Järvis is an Estonian language surname. Notable people with the surname include:

Ene Järvis (born 1947), actress 
Piret Järvis (born 1984), singer, guitarist, and songwriter

See also
Jarvis (name)

Estonian-language surnames